Gia Machavariani (born 26 February 1985 in Kharagauli) is a Georgian weightlifter. He competed at the 2012 Summer Olympics in the -105 kg event.

References

External links
 
 
 

1985 births
Living people
People from Kharagauli
Male weightlifters from Georgia (country)
Olympic weightlifters of Georgia (country)
Weightlifters at the 2012 Summer Olympics
21st-century people from Georgia (country)